Arthur Seymour Abramson (January 26, 1925 – December 15, 2017) was an American linguist, phonetician, and speech scientist. Abramson was born in Jersey City, New Jersey. He founded the Department of Linguistics at the University of Connecticut and served as head of the department from 1967 to 1974.  Abramson was a Senior Scientist at Haskins Laboratories in New Haven, Connecticut, and he was also a member of Haskins's Board of Directors and the secretary of the corporation. He served as president of the Linguistic Society of America in 1983.

Abramson was best known for his work with colleague Leigh Lisker on voice onset timing. He was also an expert on Southeast Asian Languages and spent much time working with colleagues in Thailand. His other research interests included experimental phonetics, the production and perception of speech, laryngeal control in consonants, and distinctive tone, particularly in the Thai language. He died on December 15, 2017.

Education
Arthur Abramson received his B.A. in 1949 from Yeshiva University. He received his M.A. in 1950 and Ph.D. in 1960 from Columbia University.

Selected publications

 Abramson, A.S. (1962) The Vowels and Tones of Standard Thai: Acoustical Measurements and Experiments. Bloomington: Indiana U. Res. Center in Anthropology, Folklore, and Linguistics, Pub. 20.
 
 
 
 Abramson, A.S. and D.M. Erickson. (1992) Tone splits and voicing shifts in Thai: Phonetic plausibility. In Pan Asiatic Linguistics: Proceedings of the Third International Symposium on Language and Linguistics, Vol. I (pp. 1–16). Bangkok: Chulalongkorn University.

External links
 Haskins Laboratories
 Reprints of many Abramson's papers at Haskins Labs webpage
 International Jewish Cemetery Project - Thailand
 University of Connecticut Linguistics Department

References

1927 births
2017 deaths
Linguists from the United States
Haskins Laboratories scientists
Speech perception researchers
Columbia University alumni
Yeshiva University alumni
University of Connecticut faculty
Linguistic Society of America presidents
People from Jersey City, New Jersey
Fellows of the Linguistic Society of America